Huddersfield Town's 1986–87 campaign saw the end of Mick Buxton's reign as Huddersfield Town manager, a job he had had for 8 years. Only Clem Stephenson has had a longer reign as manager of the Terriers. He was replaced by Steve Smith in early January 1987, but Town only survived relegation by 3 points, which became a sort of precursor to the debacle that the next season's campaign would bring.

Squad at the start of the season

Review
The start of the season was mixed, with no win until 20 September, when they surprisingly beat near neighbours and early league leaders Oldham Athletic 5–4 at Leeds Road despite playing with ten men for much of the game. The main highlight of the early part of the season was a Littlewoods Cup tie against Arsenal, in which Town only lost 3–1 on aggregate.

The middle part of the season didn't prove to be much better, a run of 4 consecutive losses including a 4–3 loss at Bradford City, but that was reconciled when they beat them 5–2 on 27 December. Just before beating Bradford, Mick Buxton's tenure as Town manager ended after 8 years in charge. He was replaced by coach Steve Smith.

Smith's tenure started with a 4–2 defeat by Norwich City, but during March, Town went on a run of six consecutive draws – a club record. Town finished the season in 17th, just 3 points and 3 places above the drop zone. Little did Town fans know what was going to happen to Town the following season.

Squad at the end of the season

Results

Division Two

FA Cup

League Cup

Full Members Cup

Appearances and goals

1986–87
1986–87 Football League Second Division by team